Vaudoncourt may refer to the following places in France:

 Vaudoncourt, Meuse, a commune in the Meuse department
 Vaudoncourt, Vosges, a commune in the Vosges department